Heraldo do Monte (born 1 May 1935 in Recife, Pernambuco, Brasil) is a Brazilian guitarist. He has played on albums by Gilberto Gil and Hermeto Pascoal.

In 1966, Quarteto Novo (with Airto Moreira, Hermeto Pascoal, Theo de Barros), released one album and launched the careers of its members.

Discography

1960: Heraldo e seu Conjunto

1961: Dançando com o Sucesso

1962: Dançando com o Sucesso 02

1970: O violão de Heraldo do Monte

1976: Batida Diferente

1980: Heraldo do Monte

1982: ConSertão (com Elomar, Arthur Moreira Lima e Paulo Moura)

1983: Cordas Vivas (part. especial: Hermeto Pascoal)

1986: Cordas Mágicas

2001: Viola Nordestina

2004: Guitarra Brasileira

2004: MPBaby - Moda de Viola

2007: Heraldo do Monte

2016: Heraldo do Monte

References

1935 births
Living people
Brazilian guitarists
Quarteto Novo members